Konyaspor Kulübü is a professional Turkish football club based in Konya. Konyaspor was founded in 1922 with the name Konya Gençlerbirliği and has played at its current home ground, Konya Büyükşehir Stadium, ever since 2014. Konyaspor currently play in the Süper Lig the top tier of Turkish football. The club colours are green and white.

Past seasons

Domestic results

League affiliation
Süper Lig: 1988–93, 2003–09, 2010–11, 2013–
TFF First League: 1965–69, 1971–79, 1980–88, 1993–03, 2009–10, 2011–13
TFF Second League: 1969–71, 1979–80

References

Notes

External links

Official website 

seasons
Konyaspor